Peter A. Zandan (born 1953) is an American entrepreneur and expert in the field of data science and analytics. Zandan is a data advisor, board member, and executive advisor to numerous for-profit and not-for-profit organizations. Zandan is the executive chairman of Quantified Communications, an advanced analytics and communications software company. Zandan served as global vice chairman at Hill+Knowlton Strategies from 2011 until 2021. He was founder of IntelliQuest Information Group Inc., an Austin-based global research firm, and served as chairman and CEO, taking the company public in 1996. Through IntelliQuest, Zandan pioneered the use of electronic surveys and the internet in the field of market research. Zandan founded and served as CEO of Zilliant, where he pioneered the use of artificial intelligence and machine learning for pricing optimization.

In 1998, he developed and sponsored the IntelliQuest Poll which became the Zandan Poll, a survey among Austin residents that covers a variety of topics including the economy, affordability, growth, education, policy issues and the overall cultural identity of Austin. Zandan is currently a member of the President's Circle of the National Academies of Sciences, Engineering, and Medicine. Zandan has served on the board of KLRU, the public television station of Austin, Texas, and is currently a Member of the Advisory Council of Red McCombs School of Business at University of Texas at Austin. Having moved to Austin in the 1970s, Zandan earned his MBA and Ph.D. in evaluation research at the University of Texas at Austin.

Early life and education
Born in Longmeadow, Massachusetts, Zandan received a Bachelor of Arts degree in history from the University of Massachusetts Amherst in 1975. In the latter half of the 1970s, Zandan moved to Mexico to pursue international studies. After several years abroad, he returned to the United States and earned an MBA and PhD in evaluation research in 1983 from the University of Texas at Austin.

Career

IntelliQuest

Zandan founded his first major company in 1984 under the name of IntelliQuest, and subsequently served as the company's chairman and CEO until 1999. IntelliQuest focused on changing the way companies performed market research by pioneering ‘disk-by-mail’ methodologies, and later utilizing internet based electronic surveys. IntelliQuest was the fastest growing market research company worldwide through the 1990s as it provided new product, marketing, and branding services to corporations such as Apple, IBM, McKinsey & Co., Microsoft, and Hewlett-Packard. The company provided marketing information to technology companies and direct marketing services to Internet marketers. Additionally it supplied information about tech markets on a subscription and proprietary project basis. During this period, IntelliQuest grew to over 500 employees with offices in Austin, Silicon Valley, New York City, and London. Under Zandan’s leadership, IntelliQuest was included twice on Inc. Magazine’s list of the 500 fastest-growing private companies in the United States. Zandan took the company public in 1996 on the NASDAQ exchange, and it was acquired by WPP in 1999.

Zilliant

In 1998, Peter Zandan founded and served as chairman of Zilliant Inc, another Austin-based corporation. Through Zilliant, Zandan pioneered the application of machine learning and predictive analytics. Zilliant developed into a leader in strategic pricing management, providing software solutions to enable corporations to outline and manage their e-commerce pricing. Zandan helped develop the company's flagship product, called Zilliant Intelligent Pricing solution (ZIPS), which tested real-time customer pricing behavior and monitored activity and market opportunities. ZIPS was based on Zandan's assertion that “the Internet allows companies to better understand their customers [and] their preferences,” . Offering business-to-business predictive pricing and sales applications, Zilliant grew quickly. Zilliant also develops artificial intelligence-driven sales and pricing solutions for companies. In 2011, Zilliant was named as one of the top 50 venture-backed companies in Wall Street Journal's “The Next Big Thing” list. Zilliant received funding from Goldman Sachs, in addition to other high-profile investments.

In December 2021, Zilliant had a successful sale to Madison Dearborn Partners.

Hill+Knowlton Strategies 

From 2011 to 2021,Peter Zandan served as the Global Vice Chairman of Hill+Knowlton Strategies, a company employing 3000 people across 80 countries. As chairman, he developed the firm's reputation management and communications research offerings. At Hill+Knowlton Zandan provided assistance with international brand development for clients in the financial services, energy, technology, healthcare and retail industries.

Quantified Communications 
Zandanis the Co-Founder, Executive Chairman and Chief Data Scientist for Quantified Communications, an Austin-based software company that has pioneered the use of artificial intelligence and machine learning to assess, develop and improve individual communication skills.

National Academy of Sciences 
In June 2013, Zandan was selected to be a member of the President's Circle of the National Academy of Sciences., which engages leaders of various scientific disciplines from engineering to medicine in an effort to provide them with intellectual and financial resources. The President's Circle is an honorary association and membership is acquired through invitations from the presidents of the three Academies. In addition to his position in the President’s Circle, Peter is also on the Advisory Committee for the NAS’ Division of Behavioral and Social Sciences and Education. Through his work with the NAS and as a member of the Committee on America’s Climate Choices, Peter played a critical role in producing America’s Climate Choices, a series of studies requested by the United States Congress to inform environmental policy decisions. Zandan is a member of the Albert Einstein Society within the National Academy of Sciences.

Other ventures

Along with being honored in 1998 as a lifetime member of the McCombs Business School's Advisory Council, Zandan has served on the board of public television station KLRU, and Meow Wolf, an arts and media organization based in Santa Fe, New Mexico, which has expanded to Denver and Las Vegas. Zandan was a professor of entrepreneurial marketing for University of Texas' graduate school of business.

Community involvement
Peter Zandan has impacted the Austin community through his social analytics work and external involvement. In 2014, he introduced the Zandan Poll, a poll that surveys Austin-area residents to assess their attitudes on the community, economy, health, and transportation of the city. As a longtime citizen of Austin, Zandan has watched the community grow over the years and wanted to create an objective tool to measure how Austinites felt their community was evolving. Zandan provides this as his gift to the Austin community. With the help of KLRU, the poll has expanded into other areas such as “cultural identity” and affordability in order to increase understanding and dialogue on key community issues.

Zandan has also received Austin's “Soul of the City” business award for his contributions to the community and was the founder and co-chair of the Austin 360 Summit, a one-day issues conference for Austin's high-tech executives. Additionally, the former chair and continues to serve on the Austin City Limits committee as a member of the board of directors of KLRU-TV.

Awards and recognitions 
For growing IntelliQuest into one of the fastest-growing market research firms in the 1990s, Peter Zandan received Austin's Ernst and Young's Entrepreneur of the Year Award for High Technology and Electronics. The award represents an elite corp of men and women who have been recognized for their exceptional entrepreneurial achievements. Due to his community involvement in the Austin area, Peter Zandan was also awarded the “Best Visionary” Award by The Austin Chronicle, a weekly publication in Austin, Texas. Zandan also received the “Hero of Democracy” award by the Austin American-Statesman, and was recognized by Interactive Week as one of the “Unsung Heroes of the Internet.”

References

External links

1953 births
Living people
Market researchers
Web analytics